Eucosma apocrypha is a species of moth of the family Tortricidae. It is found in China (Inner Mongolia, Sichuan), Mongolia, Russia and Kazakhstan.

The wingspan is 12–16 mm. Adults are on wing from July to August.

References

Moths described in 1964
Eucosmini